Korea Research Institute of Chemical Technology (KRICT) is the national chemical research institute for the Republic of Korea and was established in 1976. KRICT is a member of the National Research Council of Science & Technology.

References

Research institutes in South Korea
Multidisciplinary research institutes
Chemical research institutes
Science and technology in South Korea